The 2010 Pan American Gymnastics Championships were held in Guadalajara, Mexico. Artistic gymnastics events were competed on September 2–5, 2010, while rhythmic gymnastics events were competed on December 2–5, 2010. The competition was organized by the Mexican Gymnastics Federation and approved by the International Gymnastics Federation.

Medalists

Artistic gymnastics

Rhythmic gymnastics 

Note In December 2010, Mexican gymnast Rut Castillo tested positive for sibutramine, a banned stimulant. On May 2, 2011, Castillo was stripped of the medals she had won at the 2010 Pan American Championships (team gold, hoop gold, rope silver), and all her results at the event have been nullified.

Medal table

References

External links 
 USA Gymnastics - Artistic gymnastics results
 USA Gymnastics - Rhythmic gymnastics results

2010 in gymnastics
Pan American Gymnastics Championships
International gymnastics competitions hosted by Mexico
2010 in Mexican sports
Qualification tournaments for the 2011 Pan American Games
September 2010 sports events in Mexico